Bright Lights is a 1925 American silent romantic comedy film directed by Robert Z. Leonard. The film is based on the story "A Little Bit of Broadway" by Richard Connell, and stars Charles Ray, who achieved stardom by playing ingenious country boys.

Plot
As described in a review in a film magazine, Pauline (Starke) is a chorus girl who is cynical toward all men. Visiting her home town she meets Tom (Ray) and kids him along, but soon finds he is different and falls in love with him. He sees her with a city chap and misunderstanding, tries to make himself the kind of man he thinks she likes. The result is that he overdoes it and so disappoints her that she turns him down. Her friend puts him wise, he becomes his real whole-souled honest self once more and wins her.

Cast

Preservation
With no prints of Bright Lights located in any film archives, it is a lost film. A vintage movie trailer displaying short clips of the film still exists.

References

External links

 
 
 
 
Still at www.shutterstock.com

1925 films
1925 romantic comedy films
American romantic comedy films
Lost American films
American silent feature films
American black-and-white films
Films based on short fiction
Films directed by Robert Z. Leonard
Metro-Goldwyn-Mayer films
1925 lost films
1920s American films
Silent romantic comedy films
Silent American comedy films